Hasney Aljofree (born 11 July 1978) is an English former footballer who played as a defender.

He began his career with Manchester United, during which time he earned one cap for the England U18 side. He joined Bolton Wanderers in 1996 and made his first-team debut the following year. Aljofree moved on to Dundee United in 2000 and spent a productive two years with the club, scoring his first four goals in league competition. He linked up with Paul Sturrock for a second time at Plymouth Argyle, where he enjoyed the most successful period of his career to date. Having gained his first league winners medal in 2004, Aljofree played an important role in re-establishing the club in the second tier of English football. He spent time on loan with Sheffield Wednesday and Oldham Athletic before being signed by Swindon Town; linking up with Sturrock for a fourth time.

Aljofree captained the side on numerous occasions, but was also hampered by injury problems, one of which kept him sidelined for 10 months. He was released from his contract in 2010 and then signed for Oldham Athletic on a short-term contract.

Early career
Aljofree started his career as a youth player with Manchester United, a move to Bolton Wanderers in July 1996. He made 22 first-team appearances for Bolton before being transferred in 2000 to Scottish Premier League side Dundee United, who were managed at the time by Paul Sturrock. Aljofree scored his first goal in his fourth match for the club, netting in a 2–1 defeat to St Johnstone, and he scored again in December, again in a defeat. Established as a first-team regular, Aljofree scored five times in the 2001–02 season, finishing on the winning side every time. After starting one match at the beginning of the following season, Aljofree was released from Tannadice, subsequently moving to by English Second Division side Plymouth Argyle, now managed by Sturrock.

Plymouth Argyle
During the 2004–05 season, he moved on loan to Sheffield Wednesday, again managed by Sturrock, and many thought that the manager would sign Aljofree again permanently. After just two appearances for Wednesday, he picked up an injury and returned to Argyle. Following the injury, he continued to make regular starts for Plymouth Argyle and captained the side during a pre-season friendly against Real Madrid in 2006. He appeared to have picked up a serious injury after 31 minutes of an away game against Southampton on 16 September 2006 and left the field on a stretcher with a neck brace. It was soon announced that he had been taken to hospital, and announced that he had suffered no injury at all.

In January 2007, Aljofree caused controversy with a goal celebration after scoring in a 2006–07 FA Cup match at Peterborough United. After celebrating in front of the opposing fans, bottles were thrown at the player, prompting a police investigation. Aljofree made a written apology to Peterborough fans, which was displayed on the club's official website, with then-Plymouth manager Ian Holloway saying, "To celebrate like that was a disgrace and I would have thrown a bottle at him myself."

Swindon Town
Aljofree had his fourth spell with manager Paul Sturrock by signing for Swindon Town in 2007, although Sturrock left for his former club, Plymouth Argyle, in November 2007, after naming Aljofree as Swindon's captain for the 2007–08 season. Under the management of Maurice Malpas he retained the captaincy.

As Malpas' Swindon team struggled at the wrong end of the table, Aljofree performances followed suit as he received criticism from the fans of a lack of leadership and under-par performances. Aljofree hit back publicly by telling the Swindon Advertiser that the felt the players were "scared to play at the County Ground", a statement that received widespread ridicule from the Swindon faithful, as they expected results to turn around.

A month later, Aljofree captained the Swindon team to a 1–0 defeat at Conference side Histon in the FA Cup, with an ankle injury keeping him out of the next two games, by which time Maurice Malpas had been given the sack. Aljofree is yet to play under current manager Danny Wilson as a knee injury forced him off in a relegation battle with Yeovil, a week prior to Wilson's arrival on Boxing Day. The knee injury was expected to keep him out of the festive period only, however, in early January, Aljofree underwent surgery on the injury, extending his layoff for another 5 weeks. To add insult to injury, during his five-week recovery period it was announced he would have to have another operation, keeping him out for the remainder of the season.

On 20 October 2009, Aljofree made a return to football, playing 45 minutes for Swindon Reserves in a match against his old side Plymouth, after 10 months out of action. However, with stiff competition for defensive roles at the club, Aljofree has accepted that he may need to head out on loan to regain full recovery.

On 1 February 2010, Aljofree's tenure with Swindon Town came to an end as it was announced that the player had left the club after both the player and club agreed to terminate his contract.

Return to Oldham
On 3 February 2010, Aljofree signed a pay-as-you-play contract with Oldham Athletic until the end of the 2009–10 season. He was released after the 3–0 defeat to Yeovil, his only start in an Oldham shirt.

He returned to Oldham for a third time in November 2010 as a coach for the under-14 side, having been forced to retire from the playing side of the game after a 14-year career.

Honours
Plymouth Argyle
Football League Second Division: 2003–04

Career statistics

Personal life
Aljofree's son, Sonny (born 2004) is also a footballer and is part of the Manchester United academy.

References

External links

Hasney Aljofree England stats at The Football Association

1978 births
Living people
People from Blackley
Footballers from Manchester
English footballers
Association football central defenders
Association football fullbacks
Manchester United F.C. players
Bolton Wanderers F.C. players
Dundee United F.C. players
Plymouth Argyle F.C. players
Sheffield Wednesday F.C. players
Oldham Athletic A.F.C. players
Swindon Town F.C. players
Premier League players
English Football League players
Scottish Premier League players
Oldham Athletic A.F.C. non-playing staff
Manchester United F.C. non-playing staff